Kwadwo Bonnah mostly known as K. Bonnah is a Ghanaian radio personality and economist.

Early life and education 
Bonnah was born in the Ashanti Region. He completed Opoku Ware Secondary School, a second cycle school in the Ashanti Region of Ghana. He continued to pursue Economics and Information Studies at the University of Ghana.

Career 
Bonnah started his career as part of the Luv FM crew on Private Party in his days in Legon. He joined Class FM in 2015 with Desmond Lamptey on Country on Class. He is currently the host of ‘Dropoff’ on Starr FM as a replacement for Jon Germain.

References 

Ghanaian radio presenters
Living people
Year of birth missing (living people)
People from Ashanti Region
University of Ghana alumni